Tuğçe Kazaz (born 26 August 1982) is a Turkish model, actress and Miss Turkey 2001.

Biography 
Kazaz was born in Edremit, Balıkesir Province. She was educated in international relations at the Yeditepe University in Istanbul.

She acted as Arzu in the TV series Kampüsistan. She played in the Greek movie Loafing and Camouflage: Sirens in the Aegean where she met her ex-husband, George Seitaridis. Before her marriage in September 2005, she converted to Orthodox Christianity to be of the same religion as her husband, an act that caused some negative reaction in her country. She also said about her change of religion "only God can judge me". After 3 years of marriage she ended up divorcing and came back to her homeland. Kazaz became a Muslim again. Kazaz stated that she quit smoking, drinking and night life, and claimed that she rejected an offer to be one of Victoria's Secret's angels, according to a Turkish media. She was a keynote speaker in the anti-LGBT protest in Istanbul where she declared war on LGBT rights.

Filmography
 Kampüsistan (2003), TV series
Loafing and Camouflage: Sirens in the Aegean (2005)
 Uzun Hikâye (2012), Film
 Son Yaz (2012), Film
 Kafkas (2014), Film

References

External links 
 
 Tuğçe Kazaz 

1982 births
Living people
Miss Turkey winners
Miss World 2001 delegates
People from Edremit, Balıkesir
Turkish film actresses
Turkish female models
Turkish Islamists
Yeditepe University alumni
Turkish Sunni Muslims
Turkish monarchists
Converts to Eastern Orthodoxy from Islam
Converts to Islam from Eastern Orthodoxy
Turkish people of Bosniak descent